localhost may refer to:
 localhost, the loopback device IP address
 .localhost, a reserved top-level domain name
 Localhost (software), facilitates access to a peer-to-peer virtual file system via the BitTorrent protocol